The Hamidiye regiments (literally meaning "belonging to Hamid", full official name Hamidiye Hafif Süvari Alayları, Hamidiye Light Cavalry Regiments) were well-armed, irregular, mainly Sunni Kurdish but also Turkish, Circassian, Turkmen,
 Yörük, and Arab cavalry formations that operated in the south eastern provinces of the Ottoman Empire. Established by and named after Sultan Abdul Hamid II in 1891, they were intended to be modeled after the Cossacks and were supposedly tasked to patrol the Russo-Ottoman frontier. However, the Hamidiye were more often used by the Ottoman authorities to harass and assault Armenians living in Eastern Provinces of the Ottoman Empire. 

A major role in the Armenian massacres of 1894-96 had been often ascribed to the Hamidiye regiments, particularly during the bloody suppression of the revolt of the Armenians of Sasun (1894).

After Sultan Abdul Hamid II's reign, the cavalry was not dissolved but given a new name, the Tribal Light Cavalry Regiments.

Historical background 
Sultan Abdul Hamid II's reign has the reputation of being "the most despotic and centralized era in modern Ottoman History". Sultan Abdul Hamid II is also considered the last sultan to have full control over Ottoman Empire. His reign struggled with the culmination of 75 years of change throughout the empire and an opposing reaction to that change. Abdul Hamid II was particularly concerned with the centralization of the empire. His efforts to centralize the Sublime Porte were not unheard of among other sultans. The Ottoman Empire's local provinces had more control over their areas than the central government. Sultan Abdul Hamid II's foreign relations came from a "policy of non-commitment." The sultan understood the fragility of the Ottoman military, and the Empire's weaknesses of its domestic control. Pan-Islamism became Sultan Abdülhamid's solution to the empire's loss of identity and power. His efforts to promote Pan-Islamism were for the most part unsuccessful because of the large non-Muslim population, and the European influence onto the empire. Abdul Hamid II's policies essentially isolated the Ottoman Empire, which further aided in its decline. Several of the elite who sought a new constitution and reform for the empire were forced to flee to Europe. After the Treaty of Berlin (1878), the Ottoman Empire began to contract and it lost certain territories. New groups of radicals began to threaten the power of the Ottoman Empire.

Creation of Hamidiye cavalry 
The Hamidiye regiments were established in 1891 following a decree published in November 1890.  There are several reasons advanced as to why the Hamidiye light cavalry was created. The establishment of the Hamidiye was in one part a response to the Russian threat, although some scholars believe that the central reason was to suppress Armenian socialist/nationalist revolutionaries. After the Russo-Ottoman war in 1877-1878 the six eastern provinces were left under the control of several non-state actors with spheres of interest of Kurdish tribes and Armenian revolutionaries.  The Armenian revolutionaries posed a threat because they were seen as disruptive, and they could work with the Russians against the Ottoman Empire. The first Armenian revolutionary party was the Social Democrat Hunchakian Party. The Social Democrat Hunchakian Party was made up of Armenian university students whose aim was "to create an independent Armenian state." The Hamidiye Light Cavalry was created to "combat local and cross-border challenges to Ottoman authority." The biggest patron of the Hamidiye was Abdul Hamid II. They were named after him and under the direct order of him and his brother-in-law Zeki Pasha, the Circassian commander of the 4th Army based in Erzincan. Zeki Pasha was given the task of collecting sufficient taxes in order to recruit Kurds into the Hamidiye. If one was a member of the Hamidiye and a crime was committed against him, the government would take immediate action to punish the criminals. The plunder, murder, and theft that the Hamidiye carried out went unpunished, but if a non-Hamidiye group did similar actions they were punished. Other groups who associated themselves with the Hamidiye received benefits as well, they rose in power with the money and land they acquired illegally.Abdul Hamid II. wanted to create a relationship of commitment and loyalty with the Kurds that were chosen to make up the Hamidiye Cavalry. The Hamidiye was divided into groups according to age: the ibtidaiye (ages 17–20), the nizamiye (age 20-32), and the redif (age 32-40). An Ottoman diplomat, close advisor to the sultan, and contributor to the creation of the Hamidiye Light Cavalry was Şakir Pasa, was put in charge of the Hamidiye following the massacres against Armenians in 1895–1896. The Kurdish Hamidiye commanders were given exceptional rights to negotiate with the Sultan. Notable commanders were Ibrahim Pasha,  or Kör Hüseyin Pasha. Over time the Russians forged relationships with Armenian revolutionaries, and with Kurdish tribal leaders.

The Ottoman Empire understood the threat this created and is in large part why they chose the Kurds to make-up the Hamidiye. The Kurdish population could potentially unite with the Russians, but with the formation of the Hamidiye they would protect the frontiers of the Ottoman Empire . Some argue that the creation of the Hamidiye "further antagonized the Armenian population" and it worsened the very conflict they were created to prevent. 

The Hamidiye shaped the "social, economic, and political transformations" in Kurdish societies. The Hamidiye received several benefits for their participation. They were able to seize much of the lands they occupied, whether lawful or not. The Hamidiye were protected during their annual migrations (periods when they took care of their livestock). They were supplied with the most advanced weapons from the state, and were given armed escorts. The Hamidiye stole money from the villages they plundered without fear of government sanction. The plunder, murder, and theft that the Hamidiye carried out went unpunished, but if a non-Hamidiye group did similar actions they were punished. Other groups who associated themselves with the Hamidiye received benefits as well, they rose in power with the money and land they acquired illegally.

The Hamidiye were not held responsible for their actions. They were assured freedom of action in raids that involved non-Hamidiye parties. The Hamidiye obtained wealth illegally with secret help from the Ottoman government.  The corruption, chaos, and destruction caused by the Hamidiye is a direct cause of their lack of order and control. No guidelines in the Hamidiye cavalry led some of its members to not be a part of the indulgences that came with the corruption. Ottoman soldiers described the some Hamidiye  as "miserable, hungry, and sometimes poorly clothed." The Hamidiye's performance was due to their "lack of professionalism superimposed on an emotionally charged mission requiring highly disciplined troops." The cavalry was not prepared for all they were intended to do because they were not trained properly and based their raids on anti-Armenian ideologies. These factors led to the slow disintegration of the Hamidiye.

Armenian and Assyrian persecution/genocide

The Hamidiye played a significant role in the Armenian genocide and largely responsible for the Hamidian Massacres that occurred from 1894-1896. They were told to take control of many lands populated by Armenians to weaken "internal enemies" along with the hidden agenda of eventually eliminating the Armenians. Regions with high Armenian revolutionary actions were targets for the Hamidiye. The Hamidiye created an "Armenian Conspiracy" to justify their reasons for killing the Armenians.

According to some estimates, about ten to twenty thousand Armenians were slaughtered by the Hamidiye units. According to Janet Klein, Hamidiye units were involved in the large scale massacres and violence against Armenians in the period 1894-96 and 1915, and they were also "implicated in mass murder, deportation and looting" during the First World War.

According to Richar G. Hovannisian, an Armenian-American, the Ottoman armed forces and Hamidiye units slaughtered Assyrians in the Tur Abdin region in 1915. It is estimated that ten thousand Assyrians were killed, and according to a document from the same years, "the skulls of small children were smashed with rocks, the bodies of girls and women who resisted rape were chopped into pieces live, men were mostly beheaded, and the clergy skinned or burnt alive".

Uniforms
The uniform ranking system was based on the 1861 patterns of cuff chevrons. Several ceremonies took place for the Hamidiye, where they wore elegant uniforms showing their ranks and accomplishments. The new uniforms were to take the place of the colorful uniforms previously worn by the Kurds. Its purpose was to create an identity for the Hamidiye who were spread across the frontiers of the empire. Other than this, the Ottoman army was greatly influenced by the Circassians. They wore cherkeska and they were armed with shashka Circassian swords and Caucasian dagger. They sometimes consisted of grey tunics or waist-belts, grey trousers with a narrow red stripe, and kalpak with the imperial arms. The uniforms slightly varied depending on the region the Hamidiye was located.

Units
The Hamidiye Regiments were stationed in the following towns and villages:

References

Bibliography

Klein, Janet. The Margins of Empire: Kurdish Militias in the Ottoman Tribal Zone. Stanford: Stanford University Press, 2011.
Klein Janet, Joost Jongerden, Jelle Verheij, Social Relations in Ottoman Diyarbekir, 1870-1975. Koninklijke Brill NV, Leidin, Netherlands, 2012
Edward J. Erickson, "Defeat in Detail: The Ottoman Army in the Balkans, 1912-1913". 2003

Cavalry units and formations of the Ottoman Empire
History of the Ottoman Empire in Asia
History of the Kurdish people
History of the Zaza people
People of the Armenian genocide
Kurdish people from the Ottoman Empire
Military units and formations established in 1890
1890 establishments in the Ottoman Empire